Ruby Theater or Ruby Theatre may refer to:

 Ruby Theater (Chelan, Washington), listed on the NRHP in Washington
 Ruby Theatre (Three Forks, Montana), listed on the NRHP in Montana